HMS Blackwater was a Laird-type  ordered by the Royal Navy under the 1902–1903 Naval Estimates.  Named after the River Blackwater in southern England near London she was the first ship to carry this name in the Royal Navy.

Construction
She was laid down on 27 August 1902 at the Cammell Laird shipyard at Birkenhead and launched on 25 July 1903.  She was completed in March 1904.  Her original armament was to be the same as the turtleback torpedo boat destroyers that preceded her.  In 1906 the Admiralty decided to upgrade the armament by landing the five 6-pounder naval guns and shipping three 12-pounder 8 hundredweight (cwt) guns.  Two would be mounted abeam at the fo'c's'le break and the third gun would be mounted on the quarterdeck.

Pre-War
After commissioning she was assigned to the East Coast Destroyer Flotilla of the 1st Fleet and based at Harwich.

On 27 April 1908 the Eastern Flotilla departed Harwich for live fire and night manoeuvres.  During these exercises  rammed and sank , then damaged .

In April 1909 she was assigned to the 3rd Destroyer Flotilla on its formation at Harwich.

Loss
On 6 April 1909 Blackwater collided with the merchantman SS Hero, and sank off Dungeness in the English Channel at position .

She was not awarded a battle honour for her service.

Pennant Numbers
She was assigned a pennant number during her career.

References

Bibliography
 
 
 
 
 
 
 

 

River-class destroyers
1903 ships
Ships built on the River Mersey
Maritime incidents in 1909
Ships sunk in collisions
Shipwrecks in the English Channel